Pudussery or Pudusseri may refer to

 Pudussery Central, a town in Palakkad district, Kerala, India
 Pudussery East, a village in Palakkad district, Kerala, India
 Pudussery West, a town in Palakkad district, Kerala, India
 Pudussery (gram panchayat), a gram panchayat serving the above towns and village